The 2018 NextEra Energy Resources 250 was the first stock car race of the 2018 NASCAR Camping World Truck Series season, and the 19th iteration of the event. The race was held on Friday, February 16, 2018 in Daytona Beach, Florida at Daytona International Speedway, a  triangle-shaped superspeedway racetrack. The race would take 100 laps to complete. In a wreck filled race, Johnny Sauter driving for GMS Racing would survive and hold off the field to win the race. To fill out the podium, Justin Haley of GMS Racing and Joe Nemechek, driving for his own team NEMCO Motorsports would finish 2nd and 3rd, respectively. 

The race was the debut for Bo LeMastus.

Background

Background 

Daytona International Speedway is one of two superspeedways to hold NASCAR races, the other being Talladega Superspeedway. The standard track at Daytona International Speedway is a four-turn superspeedway that is 2.5 miles (4.0 km) long. The track's turns are banked at 31 degrees, while the front stretch, the location of the finish line, is banked at 18 degrees.

Entry list 

†In partnership with MB Motorsports.

Practice

1st practice 
The first practice was held on Thursday, February 15 at 1:00 PM EST.

2nd practice 
The second practice was held on Thursday, February 15 at 3:32 PM EST.

3rd and final practice 
The third and final practice was held on Thursday, February 15 at 5:28 PM EST.

Qualifying 
Qualifying was held on Friday, February 16 at 5:49 PM EST. Qualifying was held in two rounds, both consisting of two lap runs. The first round included every driver, and the second would take the 12 fastest qualifiers from the first round and make them run another two lap run; whoever was fastest won the pole.

Bobby Gerhart, Josh Reaume, Cody Ware, and B. J. McLeod would all fail to qualify.

Qualifying results

Race

Pre-race ceremonies

Race recap

Post-race driver comments

Race results 
Stage 1 Laps: 20

Stage 2 Laps: 20

Stage 3 Laps: 60

References 

2018 NASCAR Camping World Truck Series
NASCAR races at Daytona International Speedway
February 2018 sports events in the United States
2018 in sports in Florida